Ha llegado una intrusa (English: An Intruder Has Come) is a Mexican telenovela produced by Valentín Pimstein for Canal de las Estrellas in 1974. Jacqueline Andere and Joaquín Cordero star as the protagonists, while Silvia Pasquel and Virginia Gutiérrez star as the antagonists.

Plot 
Alicia Bernal is an honest and good young woman who has lived her entire life in a boarding school in Mexico City. She has studied thanks to a mysterious person who pays the bills, but Alicia has never known who it is because she is an orphan and the only person who has is her friend Hilda Moreno Sainz. However, this friendship is strange.

Cast 
 Jacqueline Andere as Alicia Bernal / Hilda Moreno Sáinz
 Joaquín Cordero as Ingeniero Carlos Morán
 Silvia Pasquel as Hilda Moreno Sáinz / Verónica
 Rafael Banquells as Don Rafael Moreno
 Virginia Gutiérrez as Virginia Moreno
 Rogelio Guerra as Gabino
 Rosario Granados as Daniela
 Héctor Gómez as Cuco
 Augusto Benedico as Ingeniero Ernesto Lascuráin
 Angelines Fernández as Carmelita
 Alma Muriel as Nelly Carvajal
 Patricia Aspíllaga as Margarita
 Raúl "Chato" Padilla as Yando
 Carmen Salas as Esperanza
 Ricardo Cortés as Luis
 Claudio Obregón as Dr. Rubén Carvajal
 Wally Barrón as Pancho
 Miguel Suárez as Herminio
 Emma Grise as Juana
 Carlos East as Tony
 Rocío Banquells

References

External links 

Mexican telenovelas
1974 telenovelas
Televisa telenovelas
Spanish-language telenovelas
1974 Mexican television series debuts
1974 Mexican television series endings